is a Japanese former wrestler who competed in the 1976 Summer Olympics.

References

External links 
 

1950 births
Living people
Japanese male sport wrestlers
Olympic wrestlers of Japan
Wrestlers at the 1976 Summer Olympics
Asian Games medalists in wrestling
Asian Games gold medalists for Japan
Asian Games silver medalists for Japan
Wrestlers at the 1974 Asian Games
Wrestlers at the 1978 Asian Games
Wrestlers at the 1982 Asian Games
Medalists at the 1974 Asian Games
Medalists at the 1978 Asian Games
20th-century Japanese people
21st-century Japanese people
Asian Wrestling Championships medalists